The 35th Army Corps was an Army corps in the Imperial Russian Army.

Composition
55th Infantry Division
67th Infantry Division

Part of
2nd Army: 1915
4th Army: 1915 - 1916
2nd Army: 1916
4th Army: 1916
2nd Army: 1917
10th Army: 1917
3rd Army: 1917

Commanders
April-July 1917: Gleb Vannovsky

Reference 

Corps of the Russian Empire